The phrase Mountain West Conference basketball tournament may refer to:

Mountain West Conference men's basketball tournament
Mountain West Conference women's basketball tournament